The Chemical Weapons Convention (CWC), officially the Convention on the Prohibition of the Development, Production, Stockpiling and Use of Chemical Weapons and on their Destruction, is an arms control treaty administered by the Organisation for the Prohibition of Chemical Weapons (OPCW), an intergovernmental organization based in The Hague, The Netherlands. The treaty entered into force on 29 April 1997, and prohibits the large-scale use, development, production, stockpiling and transfer of chemical weapons and their precursors, except for very limited purposes (research, medical, pharmaceutical or protective). The main obligation of member states under the convention is to effect this prohibition, as well as the destruction of all current chemical weapons. All destruction activities must take place under OPCW verification.

As of August 2022, 193 states have become parties to the CWC and accept its obligations. Israel has signed but not ratified the agreement, while three other UN member states (Egypt, North Korea and South Sudan) have neither signed nor acceded to the treaty. Most recently, the State of Palestine deposited its instrument of accession to the CWC on 17 May 2018. In September 2013, Syria acceded to the convention as part of an agreement for the destruction of Syria's chemical weapons.

As of February 2021, 98.39% of the world's declared chemical weapons stockpiles had been destroyed. The convention has provisions for systematic evaluation of chemical production facilities, as well as for investigations of allegations of use and production of chemical weapons based on the intelligence of other state parties.

Some chemicals which have been used extensively in warfare but have numerous large-scale industrial uses (such as phosgene) are highly regulated; however, certain notable exceptions exist. Chlorine gas is highly toxic, but being a pure element and widely used for peaceful purposes, is not officially listed as a chemical weapon. Certain state-powers (e.g. the Assad regime of Syria) continue to regularly manufacture and implement such chemicals in combat munitions. Although these chemicals are not specifically listed as controlled by the CWC, the use of any toxic chemical as a weapon (when used to produce fatalities solely or mainly through its toxic action) is in-and-of itself forbidden by the treaty. Other chemicals, such as white phosphorus, are highly toxic but are legal under the CWC when they are used by military forces for reasons other than their toxicity.

History
The CWC augments the Geneva Protocol of 1925, which bans the use but not the development or possession of chemical and biological weapons. The CWC also includes extensive verification measures such as on-site inspections, in stark contrast to the 1975 Biological Weapons Convention (BWC), which lacks a verification regime.

After several changes of name and composition, the ENDC evolved into the Conference on Disarmament (CD) in 1984. On 3 September 1992 the CD submitted to the U.N. General Assembly its annual report, which contained the text of the Chemical Weapons Convention. The General Assembly approved the convention on 30 November 1992, and the U.N. Secretary-General then opened the convention for signature in Paris on 13 January 1993. The CWC remained open for signature until its entry into force on 29 April 1997, 180 days after the deposit at the UN by Hungary of the 65th instrument of ratification.

Organisation for the Prohibition of Chemical Weapons (OPCW)

The convention is administered by the Organisation for the Prohibition of Chemical Weapons (OPCW), which acts as the legal platform for specification of the CWC provisions. The Conference of the States Parties is mandated to change the CWC and pass regulations on the implementation of CWC requirements. The Technical Secretariat of the organization conducts inspections to ensure compliance of member states. These inspections target destruction facilities (where permanent monitoring takes place during destruction), chemical weapons production facilities which have been dismantled or converted for civil use, as well as inspections of the chemical industry. The Secretariat may furthermore conduct "investigations of alleged use" of chemical weapons and give assistance after use of chemical weapons.

The 2013 Nobel Peace Prize was awarded to the organization because it had, with the Chemical Weapons Convention, "defined the use of chemical weapons as a taboo under international law" according to Thorbjørn Jagland, Chairman of the Norwegian Nobel Committee.

Key points of the Convention
 Prohibition of production and use of chemical weapons
 Destruction (or monitored conversion to other functions) of chemical weapons production facilities
 Destruction of all chemical weapons (including chemical weapons abandoned outside the state parties territory)
 Assistance between State Parties and the OPCW in the case of use of chemical weapons
 An OPCW inspection regime for the production of chemicals which might be converted to chemical weapons
 International cooperation in the peaceful use of chemistry in relevant areas

Controlled substances

The convention distinguishes three classes of controlled substance, chemicals that can either be used as weapons themselves or used in the manufacture of weapons. The classification is based on the quantities of the substance produced commercially for legitimate purposes. Each class is split into Part A, which are chemicals that can be used directly as weapons, and Part B, which are chemicals useful in the manufacture of chemical weapons. Separate from the precursors, the convention defines toxic chemicals as "[a]ny chemical which through its chemical action on life processes can cause death, temporary incapacitation or permanent harm to humans or animals. This includes all such chemicals, regardless of their origin or of their method of production, and regardless of whether they are produced in facilities, in munitions or elsewhere."

Schedule 1 chemicals have few, or no uses outside chemical weapons. These may be produced or used for research, medical, pharmaceutical or chemical weapon defence testing purposes but production at sites producing more than 100 grams per year must be declared to the OPCW. A country is limited to possessing a maximum of 1 tonne of these materials. Examples are sulfur mustard and nerve agents, and substances which are solely used as precursor chemicals in their manufacture. A few of these chemicals have very small scale non-military applications, for example, milligram quantities of nitrogen mustard are used to treat certain cancers.
Schedule 2 chemicals have legitimate small-scale applications. Manufacture must be declared and there are restrictions on export to countries that are not CWC signatories. An example is thiodiglycol which can be used in the manufacture of mustard agents, but is also used as a solvent in inks.
Schedule 3 chemicals have large-scale uses apart from chemical weapons. Plants which manufacture more than 30 tonnes per year must be declared and can be inspected, and there are restrictions on export to countries which are not CWC signatories. Examples of these substances are phosgene (the most lethal chemical weapon employed in WWI), which has been used as a chemical weapon but which is also a precursor in the manufacture of many legitimate organic compounds (e.g. pharmaceutical agents and many common pesticides), and triethanolamine, used in the manufacture of nitrogen mustard but also commonly used in toiletries and detergents.

Many of the chemicals named in the schedules are simply examples from a wider class, defined with Markush like language. For example, all chemicals in the class "O-Alkyl (<=C10, incl. cycloalkyl) alkyl (Me, Et, n-Pr or i-Pr)- phosphonofluoridates chemicals" are controlled, despite only a few named examples being given, such as Soman.

This can make it more challenging for companies to identify if chemicals they handle are subject to the CWC, especially Schedule 2 and 3 chemicals (such as Alkylphosphorus chemicals).  For example, Amgard 1045 is a flame retardant, but falls within Schedule 2B as part of Alkylphosphorus chemical class. This approach is also used in controlled drug legislation in many country's and are often termed "class wide controls" or "generic statements".

Due to the added complexity these statements bring in identifying regulated chemicals, many company's choose to carry this out assesments computationally, examining the chemicals structure using in silico tools which compare them to the legislation statements, either with in house systems maintained a company or by the use commercial compliance software solutions.

A treaty party may declare a "single small-scale facility" that produces up to 1 tonne of Schedule 1 chemicals for research, medical, pharmaceutical or protective purposes each year, and also another facility may produce 10 kg per year for protective testing purposes. An unlimited number of other facilities may produce Schedule 1 chemicals, subject to a total 10 kg annual limit, for research, medical or pharmaceutical purposes, but any facility producing more than 100 grams must be declared.

The treaty also deals with carbon compounds called in the treaty "discrete organic chemicals", the majority of which exhibit moderate-high direct toxicity or can be readily converted into compounds with toxicity sufficient for practical use as a chemical weapon. These are any carbon compounds apart from long chain polymers, oxides, sulfides and metal carbonates, such as organophosphates. The OPCW must be informed of, and can inspect, any plant producing (or expecting to produce) more than 200 tonnes per year, or 30 tonnes if the chemical contains phosphorus, sulfur or fluorine, unless the plant solely produces explosives or hydrocarbons.

Category definitions
Chemical weapons are divided into three categories:
 Category 1 - based on Schedule 1 substances
 Category 2 - based on non-Schedule 1 substances
 Category 3 - devices and equipment designed to use chemical weapons, without the substances themselves

Member states

Before the CWC came into force in 1997, 165 states signed the convention, allowing them to ratify the agreement after obtaining domestic approval. Following the treaty's entry into force, it was closed for signature and the only method for non-signatory states to become a party was through accession. As of March 2021, 193 states, representing over 98 percent of the world's population, are party to the CWC. Of the four United Nations member states that are not parties to the treaty, Israel has signed but not ratified the treaty, while Egypt, North Korea, and South Sudan have neither signed nor acceded to the convention. Taiwan, though not a member state, has confirmed that it complies with the treaty.

Key organizations of member states
Member states are represented at the OPCW by their Permanent Representative. This function is generally combined with the function of Ambassador. For the preparation of OPCW inspections and preparation of declarations, member states have to constitute a National Authority.

World stockpile of chemical weapons

A total of 72,304 metric tonnes of chemical agent, and 97 production facilities have been declared to OPCW.

Treaty deadlines
The treaty set up several steps with deadlines toward complete destruction of chemical weapons, with a procedure for requesting deadline extensions. No country reached total elimination by the original treaty date although several have finished under allowed extensions.

Progress of destruction
At the end of 2019, 70,545 of 72,304 (97.51%) metric tonnes of chemical agent have been verifiably destroyed. More than 57% (4.97 million) of chemical munitions and containers have been destroyed.

Six state parties have completed the destruction of their declared stockpiles: Albania, India, Iraq, Libya, Syria and an unspecified state party (believed to be South Korea). Russia also completed the destruction of its declared stockpile, but the poisoning of Sergei and Yulia Skripal in 2018 and the poisoning of Alexei Navalny in 2020 revealed that the country maintained an illicit chemical weapons program. The United States is in the process of destruction and scheduled to complete in 2023. The destruction of Libya's Category 1 chemical weapons was completed in 2014; destruction of its chemical weapon precursors was completed in November 2017.

Japan and China in October 2010 began the destruction of World War II era chemical weapons abandoned by Japan in China by means of mobile destruction units and reported destruction of 35,203 chemical weapons (75% of the Nanjing stockpile).

Iraqi stockpile

The U.N. Security Council ordered the dismantling of Iraq's chemical weapon stockpile in 1991. By 1998, UNSCOM inspectors had accounted for the destruction of 88,000 filled and unfilled chemical munitions, over 690 metric tons of weaponized and bulk chemical agents, approximately 4,000 tonnes of precursor chemicals, and 980 pieces of key production equipment. The UNSCOM inspectors left in 1998.

In 2009, before Iraq joined the CWC, the OPCW reported that the United States military had destroyed almost 5,000 old chemical weapons in open-air detonations since 2004. These weapons, produced before the 1991 Gulf War, contained sarin and mustard agents but were so badly corroded that they could not have been used as originally intended.

When Iraq joined the CWC in 2009, it declared "two bunkers with filled and unfilled chemical weapons munitions, some precursors, as well as five former chemical weapons production facilities" according to OPCW Director General Rogelio Pfirter. The bunker entrances were sealed with 1.5 meters of reinforced concrete in 1994 under UNSCOM supervision. As of 2012, the plan to destroy the chemical weapons was still being developed, in the face of significant difficulties. In 2014, ISIS took control of the site.

On 13 March 2018, the Director-General of the Organisation for the Prohibition of Chemical Weapons (OPCW), Ambassador Ahmet Üzümcü, congratulated the Government of Iraq on the completion of the destruction of the country's chemical weapons remnants.

Syrian destruction

Following the August 2013 Ghouta chemical attack, Syria, which had long been suspected of possessing chemical weapons, acknowledged them in September 2013 and agreed to put them under international supervision. On 14 September Syria deposited its instrument of accession to the CWC with the United Nations as the depositary and agreed to its provisional application pending entry into force effective 14 October. An accelerated destruction schedule was devised by Russia and the United States on 14 September, and was endorsed by United Nations Security Council Resolution 2118 and the OPCW Executive Council Decision EC-M-33/DEC.1. Their deadline for destruction was the first half of 2014. Syria gave the OPCW an inventory of its chemical weapons arsenal and began its destruction in October 2013, 2 weeks before its formal entry into force, while applying the convention provisionally. All declared Category 1 materials were destroyed by August 2014. However, the Khan Shaykhun chemical attack in April 2017 indicated that undeclared stockpiles probably remained in the country. A chemical attack on Douma occurred on 7 April 2018 that killed at least 49 civilians with scores injured, and which has been blamed on the Assad government.

Controversy arose in November 2019 over the OPCW's finding on the Douma chemical weapons attack when Wikileaks published emails by an OPCW staff member saying a report on this incident "misrepresents the facts" and contains "unintended bias". The OPCW staff member questioned the report's finding that OPCW's inspectors had "sufficient evidence at this time to determine that chlorine, or another reactive chlorine-containing chemical, was likely released from cylinders". The staff member alleged this finding was "highly misleading and not supported by the facts" and said he would attach his own differing observations if this version of the report was released. On 25 November 2019, OPCW Director General Fernando Arias, in a speech to the OPCW's annual conference in The Hague, defended the Organization's report on the Douma incident, stating "While some of these diverse views continue to circulate in some public discussion forums, I would like to reiterate that I stand by the independent, professional conclusion" of the probe.

Financial support for destruction
Financial support for the Albanian and Libyan stockpile destruction programmes was provided by the United States. Russia received support from a number of countries, including the United States, the United Kingdom, Germany, the Netherlands, Italy and Canada; with some $2 billion given by 2004. Costs for Albania's program were approximately US$48 million. The United States has spent $20 billion and expected to spend a further $40 billion.

Known chemical weapons production facilities
Fourteen states parties have declared chemical weapons production facilities (CWPFs):

{|width=100% style="background:transparent"
|- valign=top
| style="width:25%;"|

| style="width:25%;"|

| style="width:25%;"|

| style="width:25%;"|

|}
1 non-disclosed state party (referred to as "A State Party" in OPCW-communications; said to be South Korea)

Currently all 97 declared production facilities have been deactivated and certified as either destroyed (74) or converted (23) to civilian use.

See also

Related international law
Australia Group of countries and the European Commission that helps member nations identify exports which need to be controlled so as not to contribute to the spread of chemical and biological weapons
1990 US-Soviet Arms Control Agreement
General-purpose criterion, a concept in international law that broadly governs international agreements with respect to chemical weapons 
Geneva Protocol, a treaty prohibiting the first use of chemical and biological weapons

Worldwide treaties for other types of weapons of mass destruction 

Biological Weapons Convention (BWC) (states parties)
Nuclear Non-Proliferation Treaty (NPT) (states parties)
Treaty on the Prohibition of Nuclear Weapons (TPNW) (states parties)

Chemical weapons

Chemical warfare
Weapons of mass destruction
Tear gas

Related remembrance day
Day of Remembrance for all Victims of Chemical Warfare

References

External links

 Full text of the Chemical Weapons Convention, OPCW
 Online text of the Chemical Weapons Convention: Articles, Annexes including Chemical Schedules, OPCW
 Fact Sheets , OPCW
 Chemical Weapons Convention: Ratifying Countries, OPCW
 Chemical Weapons Convention Website, United States
 The Chemical Weapons Convention at a Glance, Arms Control Association
 Chemical Warfare Chemicals and Precursors, Chemlink Pty Ltd, Australia
 Introductory note by Michael Bothe, procedural history note and audiovisual material on the Convention on the Prohibition of the Development, Production, Stockpiling and Use of Chemical Weapons and on their Destruction in the Historic Archives of the United Nations Audiovisual Library of International Law
 Lecture by Santiago Oñate Laborde entitled The Chemical Weapons Convention: an Overview in the Lecture Series of the United Nations Audiovisual Library of International Law

Arms control treaties
Chemical warfare
Human rights instruments
Chemical weapons demilitarization
Non-proliferation treaties
Treaties concluded in 1993
Treaties entered into force in 1997
Treaties of the Afghan Transitional Administration
Treaties of Albania
Treaties of Algeria
Treaties of Andorra
Treaties of Angola
Treaties of Antigua and Barbuda
Treaties of Argentina
Treaties of Armenia
Treaties of Australia
Treaties of Austria
Treaties of Azerbaijan
Treaties of the Bahamas
Treaties of Bahrain
Treaties of Bangladesh
Treaties of Barbados
Treaties of Belarus
Treaties of Belgium
Treaties of Belize
Treaties of Benin
Treaties of Bhutan
Treaties of Bolivia
Treaties of Bosnia and Herzegovina
Treaties of Botswana
Treaties of Brazil
Treaties of Brunei
Treaties of Bulgaria
Treaties of Burkina Faso
Treaties of Myanmar
Treaties of Burundi
Treaties of Cambodia
Treaties of Cameroon
Treaties of Canada
Treaties of Cape Verde
Treaties of the Central African Republic
Treaties of Chad
Treaties of Chile
Treaties of the People's Republic of China
Treaties of Colombia
Treaties of the Comoros
Treaties of the Republic of the Congo
Treaties of the Democratic Republic of the Congo
Treaties of the Cook Islands
Treaties of Costa Rica
Treaties of Ivory Coast
Treaties of Croatia
Treaties of Cuba
Treaties of Cyprus
Treaties of the Czech Republic
Treaties of Denmark
Treaties of the Dominican Republic
Treaties of Djibouti
Treaties of Dominica
Treaties of Ecuador
Treaties of El Salvador
Treaties of Equatorial Guinea
Treaties of Eritrea
Treaties of Estonia
Treaties of Ethiopia
Treaties of the Federated States of Micronesia
Treaties of Fiji
Treaties of Finland
Treaties of France
Treaties of Gabon
Treaties of the Gambia
Treaties of Georgia (country)
Treaties of Germany
Treaties of Ghana
Treaties of Greece
Treaties of Grenada
Treaties of Guatemala
Treaties of Guinea
Treaties of Guinea-Bissau
Treaties of Guyana
Treaties of Haiti
Treaties of the Holy See
Treaties of Honduras
Treaties of Hungary
Treaties of Iceland
Treaties of India
Treaties of Indonesia
Treaties of Iran
Treaties of Iraq
Treaties of Ireland
Treaties of Italy
Treaties of Jamaica
Treaties of Jordan
Treaties of Japan
Treaties of Kazakhstan
Treaties of Kenya
Treaties of Kiribati
Treaties of Kuwait
Treaties of Kyrgyzstan
Treaties of Laos
Treaties of Latvia
Treaties of Lebanon
Treaties of Lesotho
Treaties of Liberia
Treaties of the Libyan Arab Jamahiriya
Treaties of Liechtenstein
Treaties of Lithuania
Treaties of Luxembourg
Treaties of North Macedonia
Treaties of Madagascar
Treaties of Malawi
Treaties of Malaysia
Treaties of the Maldives
Treaties of Mali
Treaties of Malta
Treaties of the Marshall Islands
Treaties of Mauritania
Treaties of Mauritius
Treaties of Mexico
Treaties of Moldova
Treaties of Monaco
Treaties of Mongolia
Treaties of Montenegro
Treaties of Morocco
Treaties of Mozambique
Treaties of Namibia
Treaties of Nauru
Treaties of Nepal
Treaties of the Netherlands
Treaties of New Zealand
Treaties of Nicaragua
Treaties of Niger
Treaties of Nigeria
Treaties of Niue
Treaties of Norway
Treaties of Oman
Treaties of Pakistan
Treaties of Palau
Treaties of Panama
Treaties of Papua New Guinea
Treaties of Paraguay
Treaties of Peru
Treaties of the Philippines
Treaties of Poland
Treaties of Portugal
Treaties of Qatar
Treaties of Romania
Treaties of Russia
Treaties of Rwanda
Treaties of Saint Kitts and Nevis
Treaties of Saint Lucia
Treaties of Saint Vincent and the Grenadines
Treaties of Samoa
Treaties of San Marino
Treaties of São Tomé and Príncipe
Treaties of Saudi Arabia
Treaties of Senegal
Treaties of Serbia and Montenegro
Treaties of Seychelles
Treaties of Sierra Leone
Treaties of Singapore
Treaties of Slovakia
Treaties of Slovenia
Treaties of the Solomon Islands
Treaties of Somalia
Treaties of South Africa
Treaties of South Korea
Treaties of Spain
Treaties of Sri Lanka
Treaties of the Republic of the Sudan (1985–2011)
Treaties of Suriname
Treaties of Eswatini
Treaties of Sweden
Treaties of Switzerland
Treaties of Syria
Treaties of Tajikistan
Treaties of Tanzania
Treaties of Thailand
Treaties of East Timor
Treaties of Togo
Treaties of Tonga
Treaties of Trinidad and Tobago
Treaties of Tunisia
Treaties of Turkey
Treaties of Turkmenistan
Treaties of Tuvalu
Treaties of Uganda
Treaties of Ukraine
Treaties of the United Arab Emirates
Treaties of the United Kingdom
Treaties of the United States
Treaties of Uruguay
Treaties of Uzbekistan
Treaties of Vanuatu
Treaties of Venezuela
Treaties of Vietnam
Treaties of Yemen
Treaties of Zambia
Treaties of Zimbabwe
Treaties establishing intergovernmental organizations
Treaties extended to Aruba
Treaties extended to the Netherlands Antilles
Treaties extended to Guernsey
Treaties extended to Jersey
Treaties extended to the Isle of Man
Treaties extended to Anguilla
Treaties extended to Bermuda
Treaties extended to the British Antarctic Territory
Treaties extended to the British Indian Ocean Territory
Treaties extended to the British Virgin Islands
Treaties extended to the Cayman Islands
Treaties extended to the Falkland Islands
Treaties extended to Gibraltar
Treaties extended to Montserrat
Treaties extended to the Pitcairn Islands
Treaties extended to Saint Helena, Ascension and Tristan da Cunha
Treaties extended to South Georgia and the South Sandwich Islands
Treaties extended to Akrotiri and Dhekelia
Treaties extended to the Turks and Caicos Islands
Treaties extended to Greenland
Treaties extended to the Faroe Islands